The Old Tatar (İske imlâ: يسكى تاتار تلى, translit. , Volga Turki) was a literary language used by some ethnic groups of the Volga-Ural region (Tatars and others) from the Middle Ages till the 19th century.

Old Tatar is a member of the Kipchak (or Northwestern) group of Turkic languages, although it is partly derived from the ancient Bulgar language (the first poem, considered to be written by Qol Ghali in Old Tatar dates back to Volga Bulgaria's epoch). It included many Persian and Arabic loans.

In its written form the language was spelled uniformly among different ethnic groups, speaking different Turkic languages of the Kipchak group, but pronunciation differed from one people to another, approximating to the spoken language, making this written form universal for different languages. The main reason for this universal usage was that the principal differences between the languages of the Kipchak group are in the pronunciation of the vowels, which was not adequately represented by the Arabic script.

The language formerly used the Arabic script and later its variant İske imlâ. The Old Tatar Language is a language of Idel-Ural poetry and literature. With the Ottoman Turkish, Azeri, Kipchak, Khaqani Turkic and Chagatai, they were the only Turkic literary languages used in the Middle Ages. It was actively used in publishing until 1905, when the first Tatar newspaper started being published in modern Tatar, which until then had been used only in a spoken form.

References

Sources

See also
 Turki
Bashkir language
 Tatar language

Agglutinative languages
Turkic languages
Tatar language
Extinct languages of Europe
Kipchak languages